The 1975 Suisse Open Gstaad was a men's tennis tournament played on outdoor clay courts in Gstaad, Switzerland. It was the 30th edition of the tournament and was held from 7 July through 13 July 1975. The tournament was part of the Grand Prix tennis circuit and categorized in Group B. Ken Rosewall won the singles title and the accompanying $8,000 prize money.

Finals

Singles
 Ken Rosewall defeated  Karl Meiler 6–4, 6–4, 6–3

Doubles
 Jürgen Fassbender /  Hans-Jürgen Pohmann defeated  Colin Dowdeswell /  Ken Rosewall 6–4, 9–7, 6–1

References

External links
 Official website
 ATP – Tournament profile
 ITF – Tournament details

Swiss Open (tennis)
Swiss Open Gstaad
Suisse Open Gstaad
Suisse Open Gstaad